Ilie Bria (born 23 March 1989) is a Moldovan cross-country skier. He competed in the men's sprint event at the 2006 Winter Olympics.

References

1989 births
Living people
Moldovan male cross-country skiers
Olympic cross-country skiers of Moldova
Cross-country skiers at the 2006 Winter Olympics
Place of birth missing (living people)